A statue of Christopher Columbus is installed in Bridgeport, Connecticut's Seaside Park, in the United States.

History
The statue was vandalized in 2017; red paint was thrown on the artwork and "Kill the Colonizer" was written at the base.

In 2020, the statue was removed and placed in storage during the George Floyd protests.

See also

 List of monuments and memorials removed during the George Floyd protests
 List of monuments and memorials to Christopher Columbus

References

External links
 

Buildings and structures in Bridgeport, Connecticut
Monuments and memorials in Connecticut
Outdoor sculptures in Connecticut
Sculptures of men in Connecticut
Statues in Connecticut
Bridgeport, Connecticut
Vandalized works of art in Connecticut
Monuments and memorials removed during the George Floyd protests
Statues removed in 2020